Swarna Mallawarachchi (born 1 August 1948), is an actress in Sri Lankan cinema. Often known as the "Golden star of Sinhalese cinema", Swarna began her acting career whilst still a schoolgirl, starring in the 1966 blockbuster film Sath Samudura directed by Siri Gunasinghe. During a career that spanning over 40 years, Swarna has won the 'Best Actress Award' 26 times, most by a Sri Lankan actress.

Personal life
She was born on 1 August 1948  in Kosgas Junction, Grandpass, Colombo. She completed education at Vijayaba Maha Vidyalaya, Grandpass.

In a Colombo municipal election, Swarna, along with other communist leaders such as Peter Kehnemann and K. P. de Silva, fielded Abeysena, a candidate from his party in the Northern Grandpass division.

Career
In school times, she collaborated her friend Kanthi Kalyani Atugoda for the Handwritten school magazine "Pipena Kumudu". Through the magazine, she showcased her abilities.

Swarna left Sri Lankan cinema for a brief period in the 1970s to live abroad. When she returned after a four-year absence there was an influx of new actresses. Swarna accepted supporting roles from directors during this period however obtained the Best Actress awards for these roles during these years. 

In 1983, she played the main role 'Ranmali' in the thriller drama film Dadayama directed by Vasantha Obeysekera. After receiving positive reviews by the critics, she won the Best Actress award at Sarasaviya Awards for the role.

She was appointed the UNHCR ambassador for women's rights in Sri Lanka since 2004.

Swarna's truly unique role as an actress is evident in films such as Vasantha Obeysekera's Dadayama (The Hunt) and Kadapathaka Chayava (Reflections in the Mirror), Dharmasiri Bandaranayake's Suddhilage Kathawa (The Story of Suddhi) and Bava Duka / Bava Karma, Sumitra Peries' Sagara Jalaya (Letter Written in the Sand) and Prasanna Vithanage's Anantha Rathriya (Dark Night of the Soul).

Filmography 
 No. denotes the Number of Sri Lankan film in the Sri Lankan cinema.

Awards

Presidential Awards

|-
|| 1981 ||| Hansa Vilak || Best Actress ||  
|-
|| 1986 ||| Suddilage Kathawa || Best Actress ||  
|-
|| 1997 ||| Bawa Duka || Best Actress ||  
|-
|| 1998 ||| Channa Kinnari || Best Actress ||  
|-
|| 2017 ||| Age Asa Aga || Best Actress ||  
|-
|| 2017 ||| Contribution to Cinema || Lifetime Achievement ||

OCIC Awards

|-
|| 1982 ||| Ridi Nimnaya  Biththi Hathara Yahalu Yeheli || Best Actress ||  
|-
|| 1983 ||| Dadayama || Best Actress ||  
|-
|| 1984 ||| Maya || Best Actress ||  
|-
|| 1985 ||| Suddilage Kathawa || Best Actress ||  
|-
|| 1988 ||| Sagara Jalaya || Best Actress ||  
|-
|| 1989 ||| Kadapathaka Chaya || Best Actress ||  
|-
|| 1996 ||| Anantha Rathriya || Best Actress ||  
|-
|| 1997 ||| Bawa Duka || Best Actress ||  
|-
|| 1998 ||| Channa Kinnari || Best Actress ||  
|-
|| 2017 ||| Age Asa Aga || Best Actress ||

Sarasaviya Awards

|-
|| 1983 ||| Dadayama || Best Actress ||  
|-
|| 1985 ||| Suddilage Kathawa || Best Actress ||  
|-
|| 1988 ||| Sagara Jalaya || Best Actress ||  
|-
|| 1997 ||| Bawa Duka || Best Actress ||  
|-
|| 1998 ||| Channa Kinnari || Best Actress ||  
|-
|| 2014 ||| Contribution to Cinema || Lifetime Achievement ||

Swarna Sanka Awards

|-
|| 1988 ||| Sagara Jalaya || Best Actress ||  
|-
|| 1989 ||| Kadapathaka Chaya || Best Actress ||

Hiru Golden Film Awards

|-
|| 2014 ||| Contribution to Cinema || Lifetime Achievement ||

Sumathi Awards

|-
|| 2017 ||| Contribution to Cinema || Lifetime Achievement ||

Derana Film Awards

|-
|| 2017 ||| Age Asa Aga || Best Actress ||

Other Awards

|-
|| – ||| Contribution to Cinema || Bangladesh Film Development Board Award ||  
|-
|| – ||| Contribution to Cinema || Zonta Woman of the Year ||  
|-
|| – ||| Contribution to Cinema || Sanpac Felicitation ||

References

External links
Swarna Mallawarachchi's Biography in Sinhala Cinema Database
Official Website - National Film Corporation of Sri Lanka
Official Website of Lester James Peries in association with Ministry of Cultural Affairs, Sri Lanka
 Swarna Mallawarachchi in Sinhala
ස්වර්ණා මල්ලවාරච්චි අසංක දේවමිත්‍ර පෙරේරා සමඟ හෘදයාංගම කතාබහක...

Sri Lankan film actresses
Sinhalese actresses
Living people
20th-century Sri Lankan actresses
Kala Keerthi
1956 births